Parambassis is a genus of freshwater fish in the Asiatic glassfish family Ambassidae of order Perciformes. The type species is the Iridescent glassy perchlet (Ambassis apogonoides). These fishes originate mostly from Southeast Asia, but the species range across the Indomalayan and Australasian realms, from Pakistan, China and India south through Indonesia, New Guinea and Australia. Although primiarly found in fresh water, a few species can also be seen in brackish water. Several of the species are common food fish in local markets, and some (most notably the Indian glassy perchlet) are kept as aquarium fish.

Species
There are currently 19 currently recognized species in this genus:

 Parambassis alleni (N. C. Datta & S. Chaudhuri, 1993)
 Parambassis altipinnis G. R. Allen, 1982 (High-finned glassy perchlet)
 Parambassis apogonoides (Bleeker, 1851) (Iridescent glassy perchlet)
 Parambassis baculis (F. Hamilton, 1822) (Himalayan glassy perchlet) 
 Parambassis bistigmata Geetakumari, 2012 
 Parambassis confinis (M. C. W. Weber, 1913) (Sepik glassy perchlet)
 Parambassis dayi (Bleeker, 1874) (Day's glassy perchlet)
 Parambassis gulliveri (Castelnau, 1878) (Giant glassfish)
 Parambassis lala (F. Hamilton, 1822) (High-fin glassy perchlet)
 Parambassis macrolepis (Bleeker, 1856)
 Parambassis pulcinella Kottelat, 2003 (Humphead glassy perchlet)
 Parambassis ranga (F. Hamilton, 1822) (Indian glassy perchlet)
 Parambassis serrata Mayanglambam & Vishwanath, 2015
 Parambassis siamensis (Fowler, 1937) (Indochinese glassy perchlet)
 Parambassis tenasserimensis Roberts, 1995
 Parambassis thomassi (F. Day, 1870) (Western Ghats glassy perchlet)
 Parambassis vollmeri T. R. Roberts, 1995
 Parambassis waikhomi Geetakumari & Basudha, 2012
 Parambassis wolffii (Bleeker, 1850) (Dusky-fin glassy perchlet)

References

 
Ambassidae
Freshwater fish genera
Taxa named by Pieter Bleeker